Lungga is a suburb of Honiara, Solomon Islands and is located east of the main center on Lungga Point.

References

Populated places in Guadalcanal Province
Suburbs of Honiara